Joe Louis Arena was an arena in Downtown Detroit. Completed in 1979 at a cost of US$57 million as a replacement for Olympia Stadium, it sat adjacent to Cobo Center on the bank of the Detroit River and was accessible by the Joe Louis Arena station on the Detroit People Mover. The venue was named after former heavyweight champion boxer Joe Louis, who grew up in Detroit.

It was the home of the Detroit Red Wings of the National Hockey League and the second oldest NHL venue after Madison Square Garden until the start of the 2017–18 NHL season. Joe Louis Arena was owned by the city of Detroit, and operated by Olympia Entertainment, a subsidiary of team owner Ilitch Holdings.

In April 2017, the Red Wings hosted their final game at Joe Louis Arena; the venue was succeeded by Little Caesars Arena. The arena closed on July 29, 2017. Demolition started in early 2019 and was completed by mid-2020.

History
The Red Wings had been playing at Olympia Stadium since 1927. However, by the late 1970s, the neighborhood around the Olympia had gradually deteriorated, especially after the 1967 Detroit riot.  In 1977, the Red Wings announced that they would be moving to a proposed arena in suburban Pontiac. However, the city of Detroit countered with a proposal for a new riverfront arena in which they would charge the Red Wings much lower rent than what Pontiac was offering. The package also gave the team operational control of the arena, nearby Cobo Arena and parking lots. The Red Wings ultimately decided to stay in Detroit proper.

The arena hosted its first event on December 12, 1979: a college basketball game between the University of Michigan and the University of Detroit. The Red Wings played their first game at Joe Louis Arena on December 27, 1979, hosting the St. Louis Blues. The game ended in a 3–2 loss for the Red Wings. The Red Wings' first win at the arena came on December 30, 1979, where they defeated the New York Islanders 4–2. Later that season, it hosted the 32nd NHL All-Star Game on February 5, 1980, which was played before a then-NHL record crowd of 21,002. Joe Louis Arena was the site of the 1987 NHL Entry Draft, which marked the first NHL Entry Draft to be held in the United States. In 1980, the arena hosted the Republican National Convention that nominated Ronald Reagan as the Republican candidate for President of the United States.

In 1990, color matrix boards were installed on the scoreboard; these were replaced by four Sony JumboTron video walls three years later, when the matrix boards were placed in the corners of the fascia. In 2006, LED video screens replaced the JumboTrons. The screens debuted November 22, 2006, when the Red Wings played the Vancouver Canucks. That same day, the arena's West Entrance was named the "Gordie Howe Entrance" in honor of the legendary Red Wing player, and a bronze statue of Howe was placed inside the entrance. Joe Louis Arena housed 86 premium suites. In 2008, the arena introduced the Comerica Bank Legend's Club, a 181-person private seating location in the arena's southeast corner.

Replacement and demolition 

On July 20, 2014, following the July 2013 approval of a $650 million project to build a new sports and entertainment district in Downtown Detroit, Christopher Ilitch unveiled designs for a new arena near Comerica Park and Ford Field which was completed in 2017 and succeeded Joe Louis Arena as the home of the Red Wings. On October 16, 2014, lawyers involved in the ongoing Detroit bankruptcy case disclosed in court that after demolition, which will be paid for by the city and state, the land on which the arena stands, along with an adjacent parking lot, will be transferred to the Financial Guaranty Insurance Company (FGIC), a bond insurer with a $1 billion claim against the city.

The Red Wings' final game at Joe Louis Arena was played on April 9, 2017, against the New Jersey Devils. The final game at the arena also served as then Red Wings' captain Henrik Zetterberg's 1,000th game. The Red Wings won 4–1, the final goal in the arena's history coming from Red Wings forward Riley Sheahan. It was the second of two he scored, which were also the only goals he scored at all during the 2016–17 season. The last ticketed event held was a WWE Live event, held on July 29, 2017. Demolition of the interior of the arena started in early 2019, while demolition on the exterior commenced in June 2019. Due to the arena's proximity to Cobo Center, now Huntington Place, it was dismantled traditionally rather than imploded.

Other tenants and events 

In 1995, the Detroit Junior Red Wings won the Ontario Hockey League's J. Ross Robertson Cup, defeating the Guelph Storm.

Joe Louis Arena hosted college hockey events as part of College Hockey at The Joe, the Great Lakes Invitational, and the Big Ten Conference hockey tournament in 2015 and 2017.

The Detroit Pistons used the arena for Game 5 of their 1984 playoff series against the New York Knicks when the Pontiac Silverdome was unavailable due to a scheduling conflict. In the game, Pistons star Isiah Thomas scored 16 points in the final 1:34 of regulation to send the game into overtime before the Pistons lost. The Pistons were forced to return to Joe Louis Arena for 15 games during the 1984–85 season, after the roof of the Silverdome collapsed during a snowstorm.

The Red Wings hosted the Stanley Cup Finals at the arena six times (1995, 1997, 1998, 2002, 2008, and 2009). Two of their four Stanley Cup championships were clinched at Joe Louis Arena in 1997 and 2002. The Pittsburgh Penguins were the only visiting team to win the Stanley Cup at the Joe, taking home the trophy in 2009. It was also the only Game 7 of the Cup Finals played at the arena.

Joe Louis Arena was the site of the decisive Game 5 of the 2006 WNBA Finals between the Sacramento Monarchs and Detroit Shock on September 9, due to The Palace of Auburn Hills, the Shock's usual home arena, being used for a Mariah Carey concert on the same day. The Shock won the game 80–75 to clinch the championship.

Former Arena Football League team the Detroit Drive also had success during their time at the arena, playing in six consecutive ArenaBowls from 1988 to 1993 and winning four of them. Four of the games (ArenaBowl III, ArenaBowl IV, ArenaBowl V and ArenaBowl VII) were played at Joe Louis Arena.

WWE hosted numerous shows at the arena, including the Survivor Series pay-per-view in 1991, 1999 and 2005.

Joe Louis Arena hosted the 1994 U.S. Figure Skating Championships, best known for the pre-competition attack on Nancy Kerrigan by associates of Tonya Harding. In addition, Joe Louis Arena was the site of the 2013 edition of the Skate America figure skating competition.

On May 7, 2015, it was announced that the Horizon League men's basketball tournament would be held in Detroit beginning in 2016 under a five-year deal; the 2016 and 2017 tournaments were held at Joe Louis Arena.

On December 4, 2016, Joe Louis Arena hosted its final OHL game as the Windsor Spitfires defeated the Saginaw Spirit 3–2.

On February 10, 2017, Joe Louis Arena hosted its final regular season college hockey game as the Michigan Wolverines defeated the Michigan State Spartans 5–4 in a shootout.

Joe Louis Arena was also a concert venue. Until the Palace opened in 1988, Joe Louis Arena was Michigan's largest indoor arena for concerts. The first concert to take place there occurred on February 17, 1980, in which Max Webster opened for the Canadian rock group Rush. This venue was used for the Alice Cooper concert film The Nightmare Returns in 1986. The last concert at the venue was Summer Jamz 20! on July 23, 2017.

In popular culture 
The arena is featured in the movie Straight Outta Compton in a scene depicting N.W.A's performance of their controversial song "Fuck tha Police".

References

1979 establishments in Michigan
2017 disestablishments in Michigan
Basketball venues in Michigan
Defunct basketball venues in the United States
Defunct college basketball venues in the United States
Defunct college ice hockey venues in the United States
Defunct indoor arenas in the United States
Defunct indoor lacrosse venues in the United States
Defunct National Hockey League venues
Detroit Pistons venues
Downtown Detroit
Former National Basketball Association venues
Indoor ice hockey venues in Detroit
Indoor soccer venues in Michigan
Ontario Hockey League arenas
Sports venues completed in 1979
Sports venues demolished in 2020
Sports venues in Detroit
Demolished sports venues in Michigan
Detroit Red Wings